Mary Kate Wiles (born March 28, 1987) is an American film and web series actress. She is known for her award-winning portrayal as Ally in the film The Sound and the Shadow, in web series such as Lydia Bennet in the Emmy-winning Pride and Prejudice adaptation The Lizzie Bennet Diaries, as well as the audiobook of the sequel, The Epic Adventures of Lydia Bennet, as Zelda Waring in Squaresville, as Sansa Stark in Game of Thrones parody School of Thrones, Tatiana in "Spies Are Forever,", Annabel Lee in Edgar Allan Poe's Murder Mystery Dinner Party, Artemis Schue-Horyn in Wayward Guide for the Untrained Eye, and Kat Van Tassel in Headless: A Sleepy Hollow Story.

Early life 
 
Wiles started as a performer in dance classes and choir from a very young age. The summer before her senior year of high school, she decided to pursue acting. Wiles lived in Fayetteville until age 18, then she set-out for Los Angeles for college.

Career
Since 2012, Wiles had starring roles in feature-films. 2010, she played the role of Alicia Larch in Dark Woods. 2012, she portrayed Lily Blush in the independent feature Dreamworld, starring alongside Whit Hertford. She also stars as Ally in the film The Sound and the Shadow.

2013, Wiles was nominated for an IAWTV Award for Best Actress in a Comedy. She, along with co-stars Kylie Sparks, Tiffany Ariany, Austin Rogers, David Ryan Speer, and Christine Weatherup won the award for Best Ensemble Cast for Squaresville. Wiles was a finalist for the 2nd Annual Streamys Audience Choice award for Personality of the Year.

Since 2012, Wiles vlogged regularly on her YouTube channel, producing music covers, fashion, and videos on various aspects of acting. Since 2014, this channel is Patreon sponsored.

In 2015, Wiles joined the internet production company Shipwrecked Comedy, after starring in their web series Kissing in the Rain. She went on to star in many more of Shipwrecked's projects, most notably as Annabel Lee in Edgar Allan Poe's Murder Mystery Dinner Party.

Wiles announced in March 2022, that she will play the role of Vicky in the live-action reboot of The Fairly OddParents, called The Fairly OddParents: Fairly Odder, which premiered on Paramount+ on March 31, 2022.

Education 
While attending the University of Southern California, Wiles performed in eight productions in four years—including Brigadoon (Jean), Hello Again (The Nurse), and The Pajama Game (Poopsie)--and two professional productions outside of school. She was a member of  Alpha Delta Pi, and she studied abroad at the British American Drama Academy.

Wiles graduated in 2009 with two degrees—a BA in both Theatre and English Literature.

Personal life 
 
Wiles has been in a relationship with fellow actor and Shipwrecked member Sean Persaud since 2014. The two announced their engagement in 2022.

Filmography

Film

TV series

Internet productions

Stage

Awards

References

External links
 
 

1987 births
21st-century American actresses
Actresses from Arkansas
American film actresses
American television actresses
American web series actresses
Living people
People from Fayetteville, Arkansas
University of Southern California alumni
USC School of Dramatic Arts alumni